B'Boom: Live in Argentina is a live album (2-CD set) by the band King Crimson, released in 1995. All songs were recorded between 6 and 16 October 1994 at the Broadway Theatre in Buenos Aires, Argentina, except for "Heartbeat" which was recorded in Córdoba.

King Crimson's Argentinian shows in late 1994 were the first live performances by the band in over ten years. Prior to B'Boom'''s release, a live recording from this tour was sold illegally by an Italian bootleg company.  The price of the bootleg was 28 pounds United Kingdom, and the sound quality was said to be "appalling."  The recordings on B'Boom are taken from soundboard mixes. However, the album was issued by DGM in something of a hurry to counter the Italian bootleg and they transplanted the line-up and instrument credits directly from the THRAK album. As a result of this, the credit of "Mellotron" by Robert Fripp is an error - although there is Mellotron on THRAK, there is none on B'Boom'', nor was one used on this Argentinian tour.

Track listing
All songs written by Adrian Belew, Bill Bruford, Robert Fripp, Trey Gunn, Tony Levin and Pat Mastelotto, unless otherwise indicated.

Disc one

"VROOOM" (including "Coda: Marine 475") – 7:07
"Frame by Frame" (Belew, Bruford, Fripp, Levin) – 5:24
"Sex Sleep Eat Drink Dream" – 4:48
"Red" (Fripp) – 6:08
"One Time" – 5:35
"B'Boom" – 6:47
"THRAK" – 6:28
"Improv - Two Sticks" (Gunn, Levin) – 1:25
"Elephant Talk" (Belew, Bruford, Fripp, Levin) – 4:25
"Indiscipline" (Belew, Bruford, Fripp, Levin) – 7:20

Disc two

"VROOOM VROOOM" – 6:18
"Matte Kudasai" (Belew, Bruford, Fripp, Levin) – 3:36
"The Talking Drum" (Bruford, David Cross, Fripp, Jamie Muir, John Wetton) – 5:44
"Larks' Tongues in Aspic (Part II)" (Fripp) – 7:30
"Heartbeat" (Belew, Bruford, Fripp, Levin) – 3:51
"Sleepless" (Belew, Bruford, Fripp, Levin) – 6:05
"People" – 5:22
"B'Boom" (Reprise) – 4:16
"THRAK" – 5:33

Personnel

Robert Fripp – guitar
Adrian Belew – guitar, vocals
Tony Levin – bass guitar, Ned Steinberger upright bass, Chapman Stick, vocals
Trey Gunn – Warr Guitar, vocals
Bill Bruford – electronic drums & percussion
Pat Mastelotto – acoustic drums & percussion

Mastered by Robert Fripp and David Singleton.

Charts

References

1995 live albums
King Crimson live albums
Discipline Global Mobile albums
Live albums recorded in Buenos Aires